Wave speed is a wave property, which may refer to absolute value of:
phase velocity, the velocity at which a wave phase propagates at a certain frequency
group velocity, the propagation velocity for the envelope of wave groups and often of wave energy, different from the phase velocity for dispersive waves
signal velocity, or information velocity, which is the velocity at which a wave carries information
front velocity, the velocity at which the first rise of a pulse above zero moves forward